Blackmail is an act of coercion using the threat of revealing or publicizing either substantially true or false information about a person or people unless certain demands are met. It is often damaging information, and it may be revealed to family members or associates rather than to the general public. These acts can also involve using threats of physical, mental or emotional harm, or of criminal prosecution, against the victim or someone close to the victim. It is normally carried out for personal gain, most commonly of position, money, or property. 
 
Blackmail may also be considered a form of extortion. Although the two are generally synonymous, extortion is the taking of personal property by threat of future harm. Blackmail is the use of threat to prevent another from engaging in a lawful occupation and writing libelous letters or letters that provoke a breach of the peace, as well as use of intimidation for purposes of collecting an unpaid debt.

In many jurisdictions, blackmail is a statutory offense, often criminal, carrying punitive sanctions for convicted perpetrators. Blackmail is the name of a statutory offense in the United States, England and Wales, and Australia, and has been used as a convenient way of referring to certain other offenses, but was not a term used in English law until 1968.

Blackmail was originally a term from the Scottish Borders meaning payments rendered in exchange for protection from thieves and marauders. The "mail" part of blackmail derives from Middle English  meaning "rent or tribute". This tribute (male or reditus) was paid in goods or labour ("nigri"); hence reditus nigri, or "blackmail". Alternatively, it may be derived from two Scottish Gaelic words  - to protect; and  - tribute or payment.

Etymology

The word blackmail is variously derived from the word for tribute (in modern terms, protection racket) paid by English and Scottish border dwellers to Border Reivers in return for immunity from raids and other harassment. The "mail" part of blackmail derives from Middle English male, "rent, tribute". This tribute was paid in goods or labour (reditus nigri, or "blackmail"); the opposite is blanche firmes or reditus albi, or "white rent" (denoting payment by silver). An alternative version is that rents in the Scottish Borders were often paid in produce of the land, called "greenmail" ('green rent'), suggesting "blackmail" as a counterpart paid perforce to the reivers.  Alternatively, Mackay derives it from two Scottish Gaelic words blathaich pronounced (the th silent) bla-ich (to protect) and mal (tribute, payment), cf. buttock mail. He notes that the practice was common in the Scottish Highlands as well as the Borders. In the Irish language, the term cíos dubh, meaning "black rent", was used for similar exactions.

Objections to criminalization
Some scholars have argued that blackmail should not be a crime. Objections to the criminalization of blackmail often rest on what legal scholars call "the paradox of blackmail": it takes two separate actions that, in many cases, people are legally and morally entitled to do, and criminalizes them if done together. One American legal scholar uses the example of a person who threatens to expose a criminal act unless he is paid money. The person has committed the crime of blackmail, even though he separately has the legal right both to threaten to expose a crime and to request money from a person.
	
This observation has been rebutted by pointing out that while drinking alcohol and driving are both legal separately, their combinations are not.

Sextortion (webcam blackmail)
Sextortion has been linked and is popular among people who are considered to have power or a position of power (in any form) in any field such as politics, education, and the workplace. Sextortion, by definition, is a form of blackmail where power is abused and used to extort sexual favors or images from someone in exchange for something that the victim wants/needs like a job or grade. An example of this is Webcam Blackmail.

"Criminals might befriend victims online by using a fake identity and then persuade them to perform sexual acts in front of their webcam, often by using an attractive woman to entice the victim to participate. These women may have been coerced into these actions using financial incentives or threats." As reported by the NCA (National Crime Agency), both men and women can be victims of this crime. This crime can be carried out by either crime groups or individuals.

Cybercrime
Dubai Police in the UAE stated that there have been 2,606 crimes that involve blackmail in the past three years. The reason it is so easy to commit these crimes online is the anonymity the internet gives. It is far easier and encouraging to commit crimes whenever personal identity is hidden. People have the opportunity to give in to temptation since they are anonymous and possibly commit criminal acts such as blackmailing. The ability to be anonymous encourages antisocial tendencies and the ability to spread fake news.

See also

Abusive power and control
Blind item
Emotional blackmail
Espionage
FBI Files on Elvis Presley
Graymail
Greenmail
Loan shark
Nuclear blackmail
Pizzo (extortion)
Webcam blackmail
Whitemail

In film
Blackmail, (1920 film)
Blackmail, (1929 film)
Psychoville, British psychological horror-thriller black comedy mystery television series.

Notes

References
 Baker, Dennis J., Glanville Williams Textbook of Criminal Law. Sweet & Maxwell: London. (2005) .
 Criminal Law Revision Committee. 8th Report. Theft and Related Offences. Cmnd. 2977
 Griew, Edward. Theft Acts 1968 & 1978, Sweet & Maxwell: London. 
 
 Ormerod, David. Smith and Hogan Criminal Law, LexisNexis: London. (2005) 
 Smith, J. C. Law of Theft, LexisNexis: London. (1997)

External links

 
Border Reivers
Crimes
Illegal occupations
Middle English
Organized crime activity